Len Kieran (25 July 1926 – 24 July 1981) was an English footballer who played as a left half for Tranmere Rovers and Macclesfield Town. He made 359 appearances for Tranmere, scoring 6 goals.

References

1926 births
1981 deaths
Sportspeople from Birkenhead
Association football wing halves
English footballers
Tranmere Rovers F.C. players
Macclesfield Town F.C. players
English Football League players